Lance Ringnald is a retired American gymnast who participated in the 1988 Olympics.  As a 16-year-old, Ringnald moved to New Mexico to train at a local club, Gold Cup Gymnastics.  In 1988, Ringnald, at 18, was the youngest male member of a U.S. Olympics Team since 20 years before.  At that competition, Ringnald made the all around finals, where he placed 35th.  In 1989, he was a member of the US men's World Team.

In 1990, at the Goodwill Games, he had one of his best international results, earning a gold medal on the high bar and bronze medals in the all around and parallel bars. In 1991, he was again a member of the men's World Championships team.  That same year, he suffered a torn chest muscle (pectoralis major).  One of his few injuries requiring surgery, it happened 10 months before the 1992 Olympics.  Ringnald was able to make the 1992 team (as an alternate), which he was grateful for.  In 1993, he was again a member of the men's World team, but, later that year, he retired from competition.

Since his retirement, Ringnald has been a cruise ship entertainer, combining gymnastic performance with discussion of his experiences as well as juggling. He also gives seminars on different methods of memorizing lists, facts, numbers, peoples' names, etc.

Publications
It's not just gymnastics; it's life: the experiences and insights of Olympic gymnast Lance Ringnald. 2012. By Lance Ringnald and Stacey Lake.  .

References

Further reading
LA times stories on Lance Ringnald

External links
Interview with International Gymnast magazine
User created gymnastics highlights video

Living people
Olympic gymnasts of the United States
American male artistic gymnasts
Gymnasts at the 1988 Summer Olympics
Year of birth missing (living people)
Competitors at the 1990 Goodwill Games
Goodwill Games medalists in gymnastics